Mark Alun Lewis  (born 7 December 1962) is a professor and Canada Research Chair of mathematical biology in the University of Alberta Department of Mathematical and Statistical Sciences and Department of Biological Sciences.  Among other topics, he has written extensively on the Allee effect, invasive species, parasitism, and biological dispersal.

In 2015, he was elected as a fellow of the Royal Society of Canada.
He was elected as a fellow of the Society for Industrial and Applied Mathematics in 2017, "for contributions to mathematical biology and the study of spatial dynamics processes".
In 2018 the Canadian Mathematical Society listed him in their inaugural class of fellows.

References

External links
 University of Alberta Home Page

Living people
Canadian ecologists
Fellows of the Royal Society of Canada
Place of birth missing (living people)
Canada Research Chairs
Academic staff of the University of Alberta
Fellows of the Society for Industrial and Applied Mathematics
Fellows of the Canadian Mathematical Society
Presidents of the Canadian Mathematical Society
1962 births
21st-century Canadian scientists